Aurelio Matias Umali (born January 25, 1966) is a Filipino politician from the third district of Nueva Ecija, Philippines. Umali is the youngest elected governor in the province since his first government office position. He currently serves as a Governor of Nueva Ecija. He was a governor for three terms from 2007 to 2016 and was re-elected in 2019.

Early life and education 
Aurelio Umali was born in Santa Rosa, Nueva Ecija, Philippines, on January 25, 1966. In 1990 he finished Bachelor of Laws degree at San Beda College in Manila. He also graduated in De La Salle University with a degree in business administration and Bachelor of Arts in political science at the University of Santo Tomas.

Career 
Prior to his entry in politics in 2001, Umali served as Deputy Commissioner of the National Telecommunications Commission. Prior to that he was Procurement and Sub-Contract Director of Lucent Technologies. He entered politics as Congressman of Nueva Ecija's 3rd District by defeating Edward Thomas Joson and later on elected as governor in 2007 after defeating another Joson. After his term as governor, he was succeeded by his wife Czarina Domingo-Umali for one term. He had his attempt to come back as a Congressman of the province's 3rd district but lost to neophyte politician Rosanna "Ria" Vergara. Umali successfully returned to government after being elected again as provincial governor in the last 2019 mid-term elections despite of the dismissal and perpetual disqualification from the Office of the Ombudsman.

In 2016, Ombudsman Conchita Carpio Morales found Umali guilty on the 4 counts of graft and 3 counts of malversation for the alleged misuse of his PDAF in 2005. Umali's P15-million PDAF was meant to buy irrigation pumps and fertilizers for his constituents in Laur, Gabaldon, Bongabon, Santa Rosa, General Mamerto Natividad, and Cabanatuan City. To do this, Umali downloaded millions to his NGO partners – P12 million ($240,975) to the Masaganang Ani para sa Magsasaka Foundation Incorporated (MAMFI) and P3 million ($60,244) to Samahan. Umali made it appear that the funds were used to purchase 7,920 bottles of liquid fertilizers and 15 irrigation pumps however, there was no real purchase at all since the liquid fertilizers had been sourced from another Napoles company, Nutrigrowth Philippines. Umali was then dismissed and bared on holding any public office.

The graft and malversation charges against Nueva Ecija Governor Aurelio Umali before the Sandiganbayan Second Division have been dismissed due to the violation of his right to speedy disposition of cases.

References

External links
Province of Nueva Ecija

|-

|-

Living people
Lakas–CMD (1991) politicians
1966 births
People from Cabanatuan
De La Salle University alumni
University of Santo Tomas alumni
San Beda University alumni
Liberal Party (Philippines) politicians
Governors of Nueva Ecija
Independent politicians in the Philippines
Members of Iglesia ni Cristo
Members of the House of Representatives of the Philippines from Nueva Ecija